3220 or variant, may refer to:

In general
 A.D. 3220, a year in the 4th millennium CE
 3220 BC, a year in the 4th millennium BCE
 3220, a number in the 3000 (number) range

Products
 ALFA-PROJ Model 3220, a handgun
 Kintetsu 3220 series, an electric multiple unit train class
 Nokia 3220, a cellphone

Roads numbered 3220
 Louisiana Highway 3220, a state highway
 Texas Farm to Market Road 3220, a state highway
 A3220 road, a road in London, England, UK

Other uses
 3220 Murayama, an asteroid in the Asteroid Belt, the 3220th asteroid registered

See also

 , a WWI U.S. Navy cargo ship